Title 44 of the United States Code outlines the role of public printing and documents in the United States Code.

Chapters 
The title contains 41 chapters:

 : Joint Committee on Printing
 : Government Printing Office
 : Production and Procurement of Printing and Binding
 : Congressional Printing and Binding
 : Congressional Record
 : Executive and Judiciary Printing and Binding
 : Particular Reports and Documents
 : Federal Register and Code of Federal Regulations
 : Distribution and Sale of Public Documents
 : Depository Library Program
 : National Archives and Records Administration
 : Presidential Records
 : National Archives Trust Fund Board
 : National Historical Publications and Records Commission
 : Advisory Committee on the Records of Congress
 : Records Management by the Archivist of the United States and by the Administrator of General Services
 : Records Management by Federal Agencies
 : Disposal of Records
 : Coordination of Federal Information Policy
 : Advertisements by Government Agencies
 : Government Printing Office: Office of Inspector General
 : Access to Federal Electronic Information

External links
U.S. Code Title 44, via United States Government Printing Office
U.S. Code Title 44, via Cornell University

44
Title 44